The sphenopalatine artery (nasopalatine artery) is an artery of the head, commonly known as the artery of epistaxis.

Course
The sphenopalatine artery is a branch of the maxillary artery which passes through the sphenopalatine foramen into the cavity of the nose, at the back part of the superior meatus. Here it gives off its posterior lateral nasal branches.

Crossing the under surface of the sphenoid, the sphenopalatine artery ends on the nasal septum as the posterior septal branches.  Here it will anastomose with the branches of the greater palatine artery.

Clinical significance
The sphenopalatine artery is the artery responsible for the most serious, posterior nosebleeds (also known as epistaxis). It can be ligated surgically or blocked under image guidance with minimally invasive techniques by interventional radiologist using tiny microparticles to control such nosebleeds.

See also
Kiesselbach's plexus

References

External links
 
 

Notes 

Arteries of the head and neck